Acernaspis is an extinct genus of trilobite that is known from the Silurian. It contains two species, A. elliptifrons, and A. salmoensis.  It is sometimes found preserved in burrows of various forms, sometimes in association with multiple moults, suggesting that it used tunnels as refuges whilst in its vulnerable moulting stage.

References

External links
 Acernaspis at the Paleobiology Database

Silurian trilobites of Europe
Phacopidae
Extinct animals of Europe
Paleozoic life of Quebec